Jonté Jahki Smith (born 10 July 1994) is a Bermudian footballer who last played as a forward for NIFL Premiership club Ballymena United.

Career 
Smith started his career with North Village Rams in Bermuda before moving to England in search of a career as a professional footballer. He earned his first professional contract in August with Sutton United. After a prolific season with the under-18s, he joined Crawley Town in August 2011 despite having not appeared in the Sutton first team. Smith scored his first senior goal in Crawley's pre-season game against Bromley, a 3–2 win in July 2012.

He enjoyed a prolific loan spell with Metropolitan Police in the first three months of the 2012–13 season, scoring 24 goals. It earned him promotion to the Crawley first-team squad and he made his debut as a substitute in a 3–0 defeat to Bournemouth on 29 December 2012 – one of four appearances on the bench during Crawley's 2012–13 campaign. He finished the season on loan at Conference South club Eastbourne Borough before signing a new one-year contract with Crawley at the end of the 2012–13 season.

On 13 March 2013, Smith joined Eastbourne Borough on an initial one–month loan. On 10 September 2013, Smith was again loaned out by his club, this time to Conference South side Havant & Waterlooville on a month's loan. In October 2013 he returned to Crawley, only to be loaned out for the second time to Metropolitan Police.

In January 2014, Smith was loaned to Conference South club Gosport Borough.

On 13 March 2014, Smith joined Finnish side PS Kemi Kings on loan until 30 June 2014 with a view to a permanent move. He made the move permanent at the end of the loan spell. In March 2015 he left Finland and followed his former head coach Tommy Taylor to Norwegian side Flekkerøy in the 2. divisjon.

On 18 September 2015, Smith joined National League North side Gloucester City. On 22 December, after 14 appearances and four goals in all competitions, Smith left the club.

On 23 January 2016 he marked his debut for Lewes with two goals in a 3–1 win at home to Canvey Island, only hours after the club announced they secured his signature on a non-contract basis.

He joined Welling United in May 2016 and spent the first month of the 2016–17 season on loan at Cray Wanderers, making his debut at Guernsey. In October 2016 he was loaned out to Lewes, initially for a month. He returned on a permanent contract on 19 November 2016, as he helped The Rooks draw 2–2 at Molesey.

In January 2019 he moved to Oxford United. He made his first-team debut as an injury-time substitute in a 1–0 away victory over Blackpool in League One on 23 February 2019.

On 3 September 2019, Smith joined League Two side Cheltenham Town on a deal until January 2020. On 8 October 2019 he scored a hat-trick, his first goals for the club, in an EFL Trophy tie against West Ham United U21. His contract was later extended until the end of the season, but he was released by the club at the end of the season.

On 15 January 2021, Smith joined National League side, Woking. On 18 June 2021, it was announced that Smith would leave the club at this end of his contract, with the striker failing to score in his 15 appearances for The Cards.

On 17 September 2021, Smith made the move to Northern Ireland to join Ballymena United and went onto make his debut a day later during a 1–1 draw with Glenavon, playing the full 90 minutes. On 9 June 2022, it was announced Smith would leave the club upon the expiry of his contract.

Career statistics

International goals
Scores and results list Bermuda's goal tally first.

Personal life
Jonté is the son of Bermudan cricketer Clay Smith.

References

External links

Caribbean Football Database profile

1994 births
Living people
Bermudian footballers
Bermuda international footballers
Crawley Town F.C. players
Metropolitan Police F.C. players
Eastbourne Borough F.C. players
English Football League players
Expatriate footballers in England
Gloucester City A.F.C. players
Sutton United F.C. players
Bermudian expatriate sportspeople in England
Expatriate footballers in Finland
Cray Wanderers F.C. players
Association football forwards
Oxford United F.C. players
Havant & Waterlooville F.C. players
Gosport Borough F.C. players
Kemi City F.C. players
Flekkerøy IL players
Lewes F.C. players
Welling United F.C. players
Cheltenham Town F.C. players
Woking F.C. players
Ballymena United F.C. players
Bermudian expatriates in Finland
Expatriate footballers in Norway
Bermudian expatriates in Norway
National League (English football) players
Kakkonen players
2019 CONCACAF Gold Cup players